Kuligod  is a village in the southern state of Karnataka, India. It is located in the Gokak taluk of Belagavi district in Karnataka.

Demographics
 India census, Kuligod had a population of 5390 with 2715 males and 2675 females.

See also
 Belgaum
 Districts of Karnataka
Sri Krishna Parijatha was written by Kulgod Tammanna.

References

External links
 http://Belgaum.nic.in/

Villages in Belagavi district